The 1985–86 Sporting de Gijón season was the 25th season of the club in La Liga, the 11th consecutive after its last promotion.

Squad

Competitions

La Liga

Results by round

League table

Matches

Copa del Rey

Matches

Copa de la Liga

Matches

UEFA Cup

Matches

Squad statistics

Appearances and goals

|}

References

External links
Profile at BDFutbol
Official website

Sporting de Gijón seasons
Sporting de Gijon